The first season of Academia de Drags debuted on YouTube at 8 p.m. every Monday between October 13, 2014 and December 8, 2014.  The judges include famous Brazilian drag queen Silvetty Montilla, designer Alexandre Herchcovitch and the makeup artist Elisha Cabral.

The season had seven episodes and featured eight participants who showed their dance skills, characterization, talent, humor and drag personality. Gysella Popovick was the winner of the season and was awarded with an international trip for two, a real wig from Lully Hair and a show produced by a club in São Paulo, and also being declared Brazil's most complete drag queen. Yasmin Carraroh was the runner-up, and Rita Von Hunty was elected by the public the "Miss Arrasa Bixa," a Brazilian variation of Miss Congeniality.

The public reception was very positive, so in late 2014 the show was renewed for a second season.

Classes

Contestants 
(Ages at the time of contest)

 The participant was the winner of Academia de Drags.
 The participant was the runner-up.
 The participant placed third.
 The participant was considered the best in the final test and was the winner of the week.
 The participant was not the winner of the final test, but was on the winning team.
 The participant had to retake the test (was in the bottom two), but neither one was eliminated.
 The participant had to retake the test (was in the bottom two), but was not eliminated.
 The participant was one of the worst, had to retake the test (was in the bottom two), and failed the final test (was eliminated).
 The participant was voted Miss Arrasa Bixa (Miss Congeniality) by the audience.
 The participant was approved and advanced to the final, but had to lipsync.

Notes 
Episode 04 - Yasmin Carraroh became the first participant in the show's history to win two consecutive challenges.
Episode 04 - Musa became the first and only participant in the show's history to retake the test three times.
Episode 07 - Gysella Popovick became the first participant in the show's history to reach the final without having to retake the test.

Lipsync Battles 

 The contestant was eliminated after their first time in the bottom two.
 The contestant was eliminated after their second time in the bottom two.
 The contestant was eliminated after their third time in the bottom two.
 The contestant was eliminated after the final lipsync of the season.

References 

2010s YouTube series seasons